East Wilson Historic District is a national historic district located at Wilson, Wilson County, North Carolina.  It encompasses 858 contributing buildings and 2 contributing structures in a historically African-American section of Wilson.  The district developed between about 1890 to 1940 and includes notable examples of Queen Anne, Bungalow / American Craftsman, and Shotgun style architecture.  Notable buildings include the Reverend Henry W. Farrior House (c. 1890), Charles Thomas House, Samuel Vick House, Dr. Mathew Gillam House, Wilson Colored High School (1924), and Samuel H. Vick Elementary School (1939).

It was listed on the National Register of Historic Places in 1988.

References

African-American history of North Carolina
Historic districts on the National Register of Historic Places in North Carolina
Queen Anne architecture in North Carolina
Geography of Wilson County, North Carolina
National Register of Historic Places in Wilson County, North Carolina